Anthony Marcus Sanders (born March 2, 1974) is an American professional baseball former outfielder and current coach. He is the first base coach for the Baltimore Orioles of Major League Baseball (MLB). He played in MLB for the Toronto Blue Jays and Seattle Mariners, and in Nippon Professional Baseball (MLB) for the Yokohama BayStars.

Career
As a member of the United States national baseball team, Sanders won a gold medal at the 2000 Summer Olympics. In 1997, Sanders' wife was killed in a skiing accident. He joined the Colorado Rockies organization as the Tri-City ValleyCats hitting coach in 2007, and served in that role through 2012. In 2013, Sanders was promoted to manager of the Grand Junction Rockies of the Rookie-level Pioneer League, and was named the circuit's 2014 manager of the year. He spent the 2013 through 2015 seasons as the Grand Junction manager. He served as the supervisor of Class A Advanced development in 2016 and 2017. In 2018 and 2019, he served as the Rockies outfield and baserunning coordinator.

He was named the Baltimore Orioles first base coach following the 2019 season.

References

External links
, or Retrosheet, or Olympic Sports Reference, or Pelota Binaria (Venezuelan Winter League)

1974 births
Living people
African-American baseball coaches
African-American baseball players
American expatriate baseball players in Canada
American expatriate baseball players in Japan
American expatriate baseball players in Mexico
Baseball players at the 2000 Summer Olympics
Baltimore Orioles coaches
Baseball coaches from Arizona
Baseball players from Tucson, Arizona
Cardenales de Lara players
American expatriate baseball players in Venezuela
Charlotte Knights players
Colorado Springs Sky Sox players
Dunedin Blue Jays players
Hagerstown Suns players
Knoxville Smokies players
Lansing Lugnuts players
Louisville Bats players
Major League Baseball first base coaches
Major League Baseball left fielders
Major League Baseball right fielders
Medalists at the 2000 Summer Olympics
Medicine Hat Blue Jays players
Mexican League baseball center fielders
Mexican League baseball left fielders
Minor league baseball coaches
Minor league baseball managers
New Hampshire Fisher Cats players
New Haven Ravens players
Newark Bears players
Nippon Professional Baseball outfielders
Olmecas de Tabasco players
Olympic gold medalists for the United States in baseball
Seattle Mariners players
St. Catharines Blue Jays players
Syracuse SkyChiefs players
Tacoma Rainiers players
Toronto Blue Jays players
Vaqueros Laguna players
Yokohama BayStars players
American expatriate baseball players in Australia
21st-century African-American sportspeople
20th-century African-American sportspeople